The Snowdon Volcanic Group is an Ordovician lithostratigraphic group (a sequence of rock strata) in Snowdonia, north-west Wales. The name is derived from Snowdon, the highest peak in Wales where it outcrops. This assemblage of rocks has also been referred to as the Snowdon Volcanic Series.

Outcrops
The rocks occur across the Snowdon massif and to its south, southeast and west, around the eastern flanks of the Carneddau and within the Idwal syncline.

Lithology and stratigraphy
The Group consists of up to 1800 m thickness of ash flow tuffs with sandstones, mudstones and siltstones and important basalt, hyaloclastites and breccias erupted or sedimented during the Caradocian Epoch of the Ordovician Period. The Group includes (in descending order, i.e. oldest last):
Upper Crafnant Volcanic Formation
Middle Crafnant Volcanic Formation
Lower Crafnant Volcanic Formation 

The Tal y Fan Volcanic Formation occurs towards the northeast and the Bedded Pyroclastic Formation and Lower Rhyolitic Tuff Formation occur to the southwest.

References

Ordovician System of Europe
Upper Ordovician Series
Geology of Gwynedd